The 2020 African Nations Championship qualification was a men's football competition which decided the participating teams of the 2020 African Nations Championship. Only national team players who were playing in their country's own domestic league were eligible to compete in the tournament.

A total of 16 teams qualified to play in the final tournament, including Cameroon which qualified automatically as hosts.

Teams
Originally, a total of 47 (out of 54) CAF member national teams entered the qualifying rounds, split into zones according to their regional affiliations. The draw for the qualifying rounds was held on 30 January 2019 at the CAF headquarters in Cairo, Egypt. A re-draw of the Central Eastern Zone (CECAFA) was announced on 3 July 2019, after Ethiopia (original hosts) and Djibouti (originally banned) were included. A re-draw of the Central Zone (UNIFFAC) was also made, after Cameroon (new hosts) were excluded from qualifying. Therefore, a total of 48 (out of 53) teams CAF  member national teams entered the qualifying rounds after the re-draws.

Notes
Teams in bold qualified for the final tournament.
Teams in italics received a bye to the second round in the qualifying draw.
(W): Withdrew after draw

Format
Qualification ties were played on a home-and-away two-legged basis. If the aggregate score was tied after the second leg, the away goals rule would be applied, and if still level, the penalty shoot-out would be used to determine the winner (no extra time would be played).

Schedule
The schedule of the qualifying rounds was as follows.

Northern Zone
Winners qualified for 2020 African Nations Championship.

|}

Morocco won 3–0 on aggregate.

Tunisia won 3–1 on aggregate, but withdrew in January 2020. As a result, Libya qualified.

Western Zone A

First round

|}

Mali won 7–0 on aggregate.

Mauritania won 2–1 on aggregate.

Senegal won 3–1 on aggregate.

Second round
Winners qualified for 2020 African Nations Championship.

|}

Mali won 2–0 on aggregate.

1–1 on aggregate. Guinea won 3–1 on penalties.

Western Zone B

First round

|}

Togo won 1–0 on aggregate.

Second round
Winners qualified for 2020 African Nations Championship.

|}

Togo won 4–3 on aggregate.

Niger won 2–1 on aggregate.

Burkina Faso won 1–0 on aggregate.

Central Zone
Original draw (before Cameroon were excluded):
First round: Central African Republic vs Chad.
Second round: Winner 1 vs DR Congo, São Tomé and Príncipe vs Cameroon, Equatorial Guinea vs Congo.

First round

|}

Central African Republic won on walkover after São Tomé and Príncipe withdrew.

Equatorial Guinea won 5–4 on aggregate.

Second round
Winners qualified for 2020 African Nations Championship.

|}

DR Congo won 6–1 on aggregate.

Congo won 3–2 on aggregate.

Central Eastern Zone
Original draw (before Ethiopia and Djibouti were included):
First round: Tanzania vs Sudan, Kenya vs Burundi, South Sudan vs Uganda, Somalia vs Rwanda.
Second round: Winner 2 vs Winner 1, Winner 4 vs Winner 3.

First round

|}

Burundi won 4–1 on aggregate.

Uganda won 7–2 on aggregate.

Ethiopia won 5–3 on aggregate.

0–0 on aggregate. Tanzania won 4–1 on penalties.

Second round
Winners qualified for 2020 African Nations Championship.

|}

Uganda won 6–0 on aggregate.

Rwanda won 2–1 on aggregate.

2–2 on aggregate. Tanzania won on away goals.

Southern Zone

First round

|}

Botswana won 5–1 on aggregate.

1–1 on aggregate. Eswatini won on away goals.

Second round

|}

Zambia won 3–2 on aggregate.

2–2 on aggregate. Eswatini won 5–4 on penalties.

Namibia won 2–0 on aggregate.

3–3 on aggregate. Madagascar won on away goals.

Lesotho won 6–2 on aggregate.

Zimbabwe won 7–1 on aggregate.

Third round
Winners qualified for 2020 African Nations Championship.

|}

Zambia won 3–2 on aggregate.

Namibia won 2–1 on aggregate.

Zimbabwe won 3–1 on aggregate.

Qualified teams
The following 16 teams qualified for the final tournament.

Goalscorers

Notes

References

External links
Total African Nations Championship, CAFonline.com
Qualifiers – Central-Eastern Zone
Qualifiers – Central Zone
Qualifiers – North Zone
Qualifiers – Southern Zone
Qualifiers – West Zone A
Qualifiers – West Zone B

2020
Qualification
2019 in African football
April 2019 sports events in Africa
May 2019 sports events in Africa
July 2019 sports events in Africa
August 2019 sports events in Africa
September 2019 sports events in Africa
October 2019 sports events in Africa